The North Macedonia national badminton team represents North Macedonia in international badminton team competitions and is organized by the Badminton Federation of the Former Yugoslav Republic of Macedonia. The team competes in the Balkan Badminton Championships.

Participation in Balkan Badminton Championships 
The Balkan Badminton Championships is a series of tournaments organized by the Balkan Badminton Association and involves participants from countries in the Balkans. The junior team championships are divided into four different age groups, which are U19, U17, U15 and U13.

U19

U17

Current squad 

Men
Petar Zivkovski
Ivan Pejovski
Leonid Stojanov

Women
Elena Risteska
Ina Stefanovska
Dea Zdravkovska

References 

Badminton
National badminton teams